The Malaysia International is an open international badminton tournament in Malaysia established since 1997. This tournament also known as Malaysia Satellite, Malaysia Asian Satellite, and Malaysia International Challenge. This tournament has classified as BWF International Challenge tournament since Badminton World Federation (BWF) introduced in 2007. Other tournaments held in Malaysia with higher level and prize money are named Malaysia Masters and Malaysia Open.

Previous winners

Malaysia International Challenge

Malaysia International Series

Performances by nation

Malaysia International Challenge

Malaysia International Series

References

External links
Badminton Association of Malaysia (BAM)

Sports competitions in Malaysia
Badminton tournaments in Malaysia